This is a list of music artists and bands from Manchester, and may also include some people or bands who hail from the wider area of Greater Manchester, in England.

0–9

 10cc
 52nd Street
 808 State
 The 1975

A

A II Z
A Guy Called Gerald
Barry Adamson
Stuart Adamson
Addictive
AIM
Airship
Aitch
Alberto y Lost Trios Paranoias
Alfie
Alpinestars
Amplifier
The Answering Machine
Audioweb
Autechre

B

Badly Drawn Boy
Bandit Queen
Ed Banger and The Nosebleeds
Barclay James Harvest
BC Camplight
Beady Eye
Norman Beaker
Beau Leisure
Bee Gees
Beecher
Bez (dancer)
Big Flame
Billy Ruffian
Bipolar Sunshine
Biting Tongues
Black Grape
Black Rivers
Blue Orchids
Blossoms
The Bodines
Tim Booth
Brassy
Brian and Michael
Brigade
Brix & the Extricated
Elkie Brooks
Ian Brown
kyla Brox
Victor Brox
Mark Burgess
Tim Burgess
Buzzcocks

C

Cabbage
Elsie Carlisle
Carmel
Cassia
A Certain Ratio
The Chameleons
The Cape Race
CCTV
Crywank
Diane Charlemagne
The Chemical Brothers
Cherry Ghost
John Cooper Clarke
Cleopatra
The Clint Boon Experience
Clockwork Radio
Cohesion
The Colourfield
Courteeners
Brian Cox
Crazy P
The Creepers
Crispy Ambulance

D

The Dakotas
Daley
Danny Jones
Dare
Delphic
Demdike Stare
Samantha Depasois
Diana Vickers
Dirty North
The Distractions
Doves
The Drones
Billy Duffy
The Durutti Column
Dutch Uncles

E

Easterhouse
Egyptian Hip Hop
Elbow
Electronic
Elti Fits
Emergency
Everything Everything

F

Factory Star
The Fall
Georgie Fame and the Blue Flames
Fingathing
George Formby
Frantic Elevators
Freebass
Freddie and the Dreamers
Freeloaders
The French (later, The French 8083)
The Freshies
Stephen Fretwell
Liam Frost
Martin Fry
The Future Sound of London
Futurecop!

G

Liam Gallagher
Noel Gallagher
Noel Gallagher's High Flying Birds
Andy Gibb
Andy Gill
David Gray
Godley and Creme
GoGo Penguin
Goldblade
Jimi Goodwin
Greetings
A Guy Called Gerald

H

Peter Hammill
Happy Mondays
Mike Harding
Ren Harvieu
Herman's Hermits
Robert Heaton
Dale Hibbert
The High
Tom Hingley
Tom Hingley and the Lovers
The Hoax
The Hollies
Hotlegs
Mick Hucknall
Hurts

I

IAMDDB
I Am Kloot
Inca Babies
Ingested
Inspiral Carpets
Intastella

J

Martin Jackson
James
Jilted John
Jan Johnston
Jon the Postman
Davy Jones
Joy Division

K

Kalima
Kevin Kennedy (actor)
Kid British
Kill II This
Kinesis
King of the Slums

L

Lamb
Lavolta Lakota
Edward Lisbona
Lonelady
The Longcut
Longview
Lovefreekz
Loveland
Love To Infinity
Ludus
Luxuria

M

M People
Magazine
Bugzy Malone 
Man From Delmonte
Mangled After Dinner
Marconi Union
Marion
Johnny Marr
John Mayall
John Mayall & the Bluesbreakers
MC Tunes
The Membranes
Meekz
Militia
The Mindbenders
Mint Royale
Minute Taker
Misha B
Mr. Scruff
Mock Turtles
Molly Half Head
Monaco
Money
Monomania
Morrissey
The Mouse Outfit
Muslimgauze
The Mothmen
Gary Mounfield

N

Graham Nash
N-Trance
New Fast Automatic Daffodils
New Order
Nine Black Alps
Jim Noir
Peter Noone
Northern Uproar
Northside
The Nosebleeds
Nuclear Fission

O

Oasis
Oceansize
The Oldham Tinkers 
Ombudsmen
Omerta
Onions
The Other Two
The Outfield
Owl Project

P

Paris Angels
The Passage
Politburo
Genesis P-Orridge
Proud Mary
Puressence
Pale Waves

Q

Quando Quango

R

Rae & Christian
The Railway Children
Vini Reilly
Reni, born Alan Wren
Revenge
Revenge of the Psychotronic Man
Lou Rhodes
Marc Riley and The Creepers
Rixton
Ruthless Rap Assassins

S

Sad Café
Salford Jets
Dave Sharp
The Shirehorses
Frank Sidebottom
Simply Red
Sixty Minute Man
Peter Skellern
Slaughter & The Dogs
Slow Readers Club
The Smirks
The Smiths
Solstice
Sonic Boom Six
Space Monkeys
John Squire
Stack Waddy
Lisa Stansfield
Starsailor
Stay+
Stockholm Monsters
The Stone Roses
Sub Sub
Suns of Arqa
Sweet Sensation 
Swing Out Sister
Swiss Lips

T

Take That
TCTS
Theatre of Hate
The Ting Tings
The Toggery Five
TOKOLOSH
Tractor
Turrentine Jones
Twang
Twisted Wheel

V

Van der Graaf Generator
The Verve
Virginia Wolf
Victoria Wood

W

Wadeye
The Waltones
The Warning
Warsaw 
Russell Watson
We Do Not Negotiate With Terrorists
When in Rome
The Whip
Melanie Williams
Winterfylleth
A Witness
Wode
Working For A Nuclear Free City
World of Twist
WU LYF

Y

Yargo
Y.O.U.N.G
Paul Young (singer,born 1947)

See also

 Cargo Studios
 The Hacienda
 List of music artists and bands from England
 Lists of musicians
 List of people from Manchester
 Manchester Arena
 Manchester Central
 Madchester
 Music of Manchester

References

Manchester
Manchester
Musicians